I'm Black, You're White & These Are Clearly Parodies is the second studio album by Israeli-American parody rapper Rucka Rucka Ali. The album was released September 7, 2010, and distributed by Pinegrove Records. The deluxe edition of the album also contains the entirety of his first album, Straight Outta West B.

Background 
All but three tracks on the standard version of the album, "Intro (Fuck You, Tube)", "Send That Bitch a Kissyface", and "It's Not Nice", are parodies to pop and hip hop songs. The bonus tracks from Straight Outta West B in the deluxe edition of the album include only all-original songs.

Track listing

Charts

References 

2010 albums
Rucka Rucka Ali albums